Saint Thomas University is a Roman Catholic university located in Bogotá, Colombia. It is the oldest Colombian university, founded in 1580 by the Dominican Order. It has campuses in Bucaramanga, Tunja, Medellín, and Villavicencio, and offers distance education.

Symbols 
The Flag: It is composed of five horizontal stripes, three green and two white interspersed, the shield of the University in the central part.

The Seal: It was elaborated to affirm the pontifical origin of the institution with the founding bull "Romanux Pontifex" of 1580, authentic mandate of the Pope Gregorio XIII and is used in certificates and diplomas issued by the University.

Shield: It is formed by the Cross of Calatrava in black and white in the center sixteen golden circular rays, symbol of the sun of Aquino, on a circular blue background and the Latin motto Facientes Veritatem, doers of the truth, in a red band.

The Hymn: It consists of eight verses, makes clear allusion to the humanist and vocational education of the university.

Notable alumni 
 Andrés Rosillo y Meruelo, hero of the independence of Colombia.
 Camilo Torres Tenorio, hero of the independence of Colombia.
 Francisco José de Caldas, hero of the independence of Colombia.
 Francisco de Paula Santander, hero of the independence of Colombia.
 Atanasio Girardot, hero of the independence of Colombia.
 Rafael María Baralt, Venezuelan politician.
 José María Samper, Colombian politician.
 Jorge García Usta, Colombian poet and writer.
 Alejandro Ordoñez Maldonado, embajador de Colombia ante la OEA. Ambassador of Colombia to the OAS.
 Pablo Montoya, Colombian writer.
 Alexandra Moreno Piraquive, Colombian politics.
 Helga Díaz, Colombian actress.
 Luis Miguel Bermúdez Gutiérrez, Grand Teacher award 2017.
 Tomás Alfonso Zuleta Díaz, Colombian singer and songwriter.
 Didier Alberto Tavera Amado, Colombian lawyer and politician.
 Mirtha Patricia Linares Prieto, president of the Jurisdicción Especial para la Paz (JEP).
 César Augusto Reyes Medina, magistrate of the Supreme Court of Justice.
 Héctor Javier Alarcón Granobles, magistrate of the Supreme Court of Justice.
 Doctor Fernando Castillo Cadena, magistrate of the Supreme Court of Justice.
 Santiago Castro-Gómez, philosopher, public intellectual, and "visiting professor" at  Duke University, Pittsburgh University and at Goethe University of Frankfurt.
 Pablo José Montoya Campuzano, is a Colombian novelist, poet, essayist, translator, critic and professor of literature.
 Isabel del Carmen Agatón Santander, is a Colombian feminist poet, lawyer, writer and teacher.

See also 
List of colonial universities in Latin America

References 

Saint Thomas University
Saint Thomas University
Saint Thomas University
Catholic universities and colleges in Colombia
Universities and colleges in Medellín